Fenbufen is a nonsteroidal anti-inflammatory drug used to treat pain.

Fenbufen is a member of the propionic acid derivatives class of drugs.

It was introduced by American Cyanamid under the trade name Lederfen in the 1980s. Due to liver toxicity, it was withdrawn from markets in the developed world in 2010.

As of 2015 it was available in Taiwan and Thailand under several brand names.

Preparation
Fenbufen can be synthesized by acylation of biphenyl with succinic anhydride under Friedel-Crafts conditions.

References

Hepatotoxins
Nonsteroidal anti-inflammatory drugs
Withdrawn drugs